Sherry Broecker (born February 14, 1951) is an American politician who served in the Minnesota House of Representatives from district 53B from 1995 to 2001.

References

1951 births
Living people
Republican Party members of the Minnesota House of Representatives